A pundette is a female TV commentator or pundit in the US, often conservative. The term was coined in the 1990s to describe anti-Bill Clinton commentators who came to prominence on cable TV during the Lewinsky scandal.  Bill Clinton was president of the United States at the time.

Role
According to Stephen Klien, Assistant Teaching Professor of Political Communication at the University of Missouri, pundettes "seemed to capitalize on a combination of conservative identity, confrontational rhetorical style and sexual attractiveness in order to gain media attention"

Susan Estrich, a self described pundette, said her success was not so much because she had "run campaigns and taught law for 20 years and thus might know what I'm talking about, but that I have blond hair and legs almost as good as those of the twenty- and thirty-something blondes with whom I am usually paired."  

The term is sometimes used dismissively by those that disagree with a pundette's position.  Women described as pundettes, however, often embrace the term.

More recently the term has expanded to include women commentators in a variety of fields, political views and races.

Notable women characterized as pundettes
Ann Coulter
Kellyanne (Fitzpatrick) Conway
Maureen Dowd
Nancy Giles
Laura Ingraham
Heather Nauert
Barbara Olson

In the arts
The Accidental Pundette is a comedy play by Nancy Giles based on an incident where she lost her temper during a panel discussion on Larry King Live.

References

External links
Kellyanne Conway sings the "Pundette Blues" at the 1998 Child Welfare League of America annual fundraiser

 
1990s neologisms
Conservatism in the United States